The 1975 Toyota Comets season was the maiden season of the franchise in the Philippine Basketball Association (PBA).

Colors
   (dark)
   (light)

First Conference standings

The Comets were unbeaten in the semifinals, winning all their six matches.

Notable dates
April 9: The very first double-header of the PBA season had 18,000 fans trooped to the Araneta Coliseum, Toyota Comets beat U/Tex Weavers, 105-101, in the second game, Ompong Segura topscored for the Comets with 23 points and Francis Arnaiz added 22 points.

May 4: Toyota whips Concepcion Carrier, 116-100, for their seventh straight win, the Comets are riding high on a 24-game winning run, counting its stint in the amateur league.

July 15: Toyota finally beats Crispa, 106-104, in their third meeting.

July 17: Toyota beats U/tex, 127-112, to become the first team to reach the PBA finals.

Championships
The Toyota Comets won the first two conferences of the PBA's inaugural season by defeating their rivals Crispa Redmanizers.

In the All-Philippine championship, Toyota and Crispa played for the third straight time in the finals and the Comets were denied of a Grandslam season by the Redmanizers, which took the deciding fifth game for a 3-2 series victory.

Roster

References

External links
Toyota team photo@interbasket.net

Toyota Super Corollas seasons
Toyota